The 1967-68 Tours (also known as The Bee Gees in Concert, Spring Tour '68, North American Tour) are a series of concerts held in 1967 and 1968 by English band, The Bee Gees. The tours promoted their third, fourth and fifth studio albums: Bee Gees' 1st (1967), Horizontal (1968) and Idea (1968). The band's line-up at that time was the Gibb brothers with Colin Petersen and Vince Melouney. Before the tours began, the group were the opening act for Fats Domino in London and Manchester. 

The concert in Bern, 10 March 1968, was illegally recorded and is available in a bootleg entitled Live in Bern 1968.

Tour band
 Barry Gibb – vocals, rhythm guitar
 Robin Gibb – vocals
 Maurice Gibb – vocals, bass
 Vince Melouney – lead guitar
 Colin Petersen – drums
 Bill Shepherd – conductor

Opening acts
Procol Harum 
Dave Dee, Dozy, Beaky, Mick & Tich 
Grapefruit 
The Foundations 
Spanky and Our Gang 
Tony Rivers and The Castaways 
The Flower Pot Men 
Bonzo Dog Doo-Dah Band 
Vanilla Fudge 
Love

Setlist
The following setlist was obtained from the concert held on 10 August 1968, at the Forest Hills Tennis Stadium in New York City, New York. It does not represent all concerts for the duration of the tours.
"New York Mining Disaster 1941"
"And the Sun Will Shine"
"To Love Somebody"
"Jumbo" 
"The Singer Sang His Song" 
"I Have Decided to Join the Airforce" 
"I Started a Joke"
"Let There Be Love"  
"Words"
"I Can't See Nobody"
"Holiday" 
"In the Morning" 
"Really and Sincerely" 
"Massachusetts" 
"I've Gotta Get a Message to You" 

Encore
"Spicks and Specks"
"World"

Tour dates

Festivals and other miscellaneous performances
Festival of the Flower Children
Hippy-Happy Festival
Forest Hills Festival
Bridgeport Music Festival
Philadelphia Music Festival

References 

Bee Gees concert tours
1967 concert tours
1968 concert tours